A spendthrift (also profligate or prodigal) is someone who is extravagant and recklessly wasteful with money, often to a point where the spending climbs well beyond his or her means. "Spendthrift" derives from an obsolete sense of the word "thrift" to mean prosperity  rather than frugality, so a "spendthrift" is one who has spent their prosperity.

Historical figures who have been characterised as spendthrifts include George IV of the United Kingdom, King Ludwig II of Bavaria, and Marie Antoinette the Queen of France.

The term is often used by news media as an adjective applied to governments who are thought to be wasting public money.

Etymology
While the pair of words may seem to imply the opposite of its meaning (as if you are thrifty in your spending), it follows the tradition of the earlier word "scattergood", the first part being an undoing of the second.

In artwork

William Hogarth's A Rake's Progress (1732–33) displays in a series of paintings the spiralling fortunes of a wealthy but spendthrift son and heir who loses his money, and who as a consequence is imprisoned in the Fleet Prison and ultimately Bedlam.

In literature
 The Young Man and the Swallow (which also has the Victorian title of "The Spendthrift and the Swallow") is a fable about a young man who spends all his money on gambling and luxurious living.

In the Bible
In the Parable of the Prodigal Son, a son asks his father for his inheritance, but then squanders it recklessly as he lives a life of indulgence. With nothing left of his fortune, he is forced to work as a hired hand for a pig farmer.

Legal issues

The modern legal remedy for spendthrifts is usually bankruptcy. However, during the 19th and 20th centuries, a few jurisdictions, such as the U.S. states of Oregon and Massachusetts, experimented with laws under which the family of such a person could have him or her legally declared a "spendthrift" by a court of law. In turn, such persons were considered to lack the legal capacity to enter into binding contracts. Even though such laws made life harder for creditors (who now had to bear the burden of verifying up front that any prospective debtor had not been judicially declared a spendthrift), they were thought to be justified by the public policy of keeping a spendthrift's family from ending up in the poorhouse or on welfare. Such laws have since been abolished in favour of bankruptcy, which is more favourable to creditors.

Receivership is another equitable remedy for a spendthrift, by which a state-court-appointed trustee or attorney manages and sells the property of the debtor in default on debts.

In conservatorship, a fiduciary handles both the personal affairs and paying the debts of an incapacitated person. Infamously, Theodore Roosevelt was conservator for his brother Elliott Roosevelt I.

References

External links

A Rake's Progress

Personal finance